Dancing with the Stars is an Albanian dance competition television series that premiered on 18 February 2010 on Vizion Plus and Tring Digital. It is the Albanian version of the British series Strictly Come Dancing, and one of several iterations of the Dancing with the Stars franchise. The show pairs celebrities with professional dancers. Each couple performs predetermined dances and competes against the others for judges' points and audience votes. The couple receiving the lowest combined total of judges' points and audience votes is eliminated each week until only the champion dance pair remains.

The show aired until 8 June 2018 on Vizion Plus and Tring Digital. On 10 June 2022, it was announced beginning with the 8th season, Dancing with the Stars would move from Vizion Plus to Top Channel. On 7 October 2022 began airing the eighth season. On the final of the eighth season, it was announced that the ninth season will begin airing very soon on Top Channel.

Format
The show pairs a number of celebrities with professional dancers who each week compete against each other in a competition to impress a panel of judges and the viewing public in order to survive potential elimination. Through a telephone poll, viewers vote who should stay, the results of the poll being combined with the ranking of the panel of judges. Couple with lowest number points drop out from each episode. Each judge gives the performance a mark out of ten, giving an overall total out of thirty/forty.

Presenters and judges

Presenter timeline
Color key

Judges timeline
Color key

Series overview

References

External links
 Official website

Albania
2010 Albanian television series debuts
2015 Albanian television series endings
2018 Albanian television series debuts
2018 Albanian television series endings
2022 Albanian television series debuts
Albanian television shows
Vizion Plus original programming
Non-British television series based on British television series